The Baumgarten Prize was founded by Ferenc Ferdinánd Baumgarten on October 17, 1923. It was awarded every year from 1929 to 1949 (except for 1945). In its time, it was the most prestigious literary prize awarded by Hungary and is considered as equivalent to the subsequent literary prizes established in 20th century Hungary, the Attila József Prize and the Kossuth Prize.

In accordance with the founder's will, it was given to Hungarian authors who had pursued literary excellence devoid of biases, regardless of creating material hardship for themselves. The foundation was administered by the Baumgarten Board of Trustees, whose members were lawyer Lóránt Basch and writer Mihály Babits (from 1941, after Babits' death, Aladár Schöpflin), and it was assisted by an 8-member advisory board. During its existence, the prize had a major significance in developing Hungarian literature.

It was given, among others, to the following people: Valéria Dienes (1934),  (1929, 1931, 1933), Andor Endre Gelléri (1932, 1934), Gyula Illyés (four times),  (1939), Gyula Juhász (1929, 1930, 1931), Géza Képes (1943, 1949), Ágnes Nemes Nagy (1946),  (1936), Lőrinc Szabó (1932, 1937, 1944),  (1947), Antal Szerb, Miklós Radnóti, Miklós Szentkuthy, Sándor Weöres, Győző Csorba, Áron Tamási (three times), Albert Wass, Emil Kolozsvári Grandpierre, Attila József (posthumous), Károly Kerényi, János Pilinszky, Józsi Jenő Tersánszky (four times), Tibor Déry, Pál Szabó, Lajos Fülep, Gábor Devecseri, László Németh, Nagy Lajos (three times), Magda Szabó (repealed).

References

Citations

Bibliography
 (Limited preview)

Hungarian literary awards
Awards established in 1932
Awards disestablished in 1949